Bilateral relations between Argentina and India, have existed for decades. Argentina has an embassy in Delhi and a Consulate General in Mumbai whilst India has an embassy in Buenos Aires. Both countries are members of  G20, Group of 24 and Group of 77.

History

Rabindranath Tagore visited Argentina in 1924. He stayed there for two months as the guest of Victoria Ocampo. Tagore wrote a series of poems under the title "Purabi" about his stay in Argentina. Victoria Ocampo was awarded an honorary doctorate by the Viswa Bharati University in 1968.

India opened a Trade Commission in Buenos Aires in 1943. This was converted into an embassy on 3 February 1949. Argentina had established a consulate in Calcutta in the 1920s. In 1950, it was transferred to Delhi as an embassy. Argentina opened a Consulate General in Mumbai in April 2009.

Argentine President Arturo Frondizi visited India in December 1961, the first state visit by an Argentine President. President Reynaldo Bignone visited in 1983 to attend the NAM summit. President Raul Alfonsin was the chief guest on Republic Day in 1985. President Carlos Menem visited India in March 1994 and President Cristina Kirchner in October 2009.

In 1968, Indira Gandhi became the first Indian Prime Minister to visit Argentina. President Zail Singh visited the country in April 1984. P. V. Narasimha Rao visited Argentina in 1995 to attend the G-15 Summit.

Economic relations
Several India companies such as TCS, Wipro, CRISIL, Bajaj, Cellent, United Phosphorus Ltd (UPL), Synthesis Quimica, Glenmar and Godrej operate in Argentina. They employ 7000 Argentines as of 2013. ONGC signed a MoU with ENARSA for possible joint ventures in Argentina for oil exploration.

Argentine companies operating in India include IMPSA, Biosidus and BAGO.

Indian investment in the country totaled $930 million in 2013.  Argentinian investment in India totalled $120 million in 2013.

Trade
A preferential trade agreement between India and Mercosur (of which Argentina is a member) came into operation in 2009.

Bilateral trade between India and Argentina was worth US$1.838 billion in 2012. India exported US$574 million worth of goods to Argentina.

By 2016, bilateral trade between India and Argentina was worth US$2.9 billion. India exported US$700 million worth of goods to Argentina and Argentina exported US$2.2 billion worth of goods to India.

Argentina exported $1.8 billion worth of goods to India in 2014, or 2.6% of its overall exports. The top 10 exported commodities were:
 Animal/vegetable fats and oils: $1.4 billion
 Oil: $204.4 million
 Ores, slag, ash: $94.2 million
 Raw hides excluding furskins: $41.9 million
 Organic chemicals: $10.8 million
 Machines, engines, pumps: $8.1 million
 Inorganic chemicals: $7.9 million
 Wool: $6.7 million
 Vegetables: $4.7 million
 Tanning, dyeing extracts: $4.2 million

Science and education
In January 2007, ISRO launched Pehuensat-1, an Argentine nano-satellite on board PSLV. India and Argentina are both members of the Antarctic Treaty. An MoU for Antarctic co-operation was signed by the two countries in 1998 and renewed in 2006.

India provides five ITEC scholarships to Argentine candidates annually. Argentine diplomats have attended the courses at the Foreign Service Training Institute of India. The University of Buenos Aires conducts postgraduate courses in Ayurveda in collaboration with the Gujarat Ayurveda University. The Jawaharlal Nehru University signed an MoU for cooperation with San Luis University of Argentina.

Cultural relations

Sports
The Indian Football Academy collaborated with Argentine football club River Plate for training and exchanges. Argentine football legend Diego Maradona visited India in October 2009. Several Argentine players play in the Indian Super League.

There is a huge fan following for Argentina's national football team in Indian states of Kerala and West Bengal.

Areas of Untapped Potential

Argentina and India have robust domestic  movie industry producing quality movies. Most of Argentinian movies feature in India only through film festivals. Movie industry of India like Bollywood, Tamil cinema, Malayalam cinema, Bengali cinema, etc. can find a good market and viewership in Argentina. This will be a vital soft power tool which both nations are not using much.

Similarly there need to be a promotion of respective country's tourism on other. Both nations can complement each other in terms of destinations, experience in tourism perspective. At present there's no direct flight connectivity between Latin America and South Asia this is a major roadblock in developing people to people interaction, travel and tourism.

Indian diaspora

As of 2013, about 200 Indian citizens (predominantly from the Sindhi community) reside in Buenos Aires, of which, half have lived there for over 30 years. Other Indian residents are employees of Indian and multinational corporations in Argentina. About 300 Punjabi Sikhs settled down in Salta province in the early and mid twentieth century. As of 2013, their current population numbers around 2000. They have become Argentine citizens and are mostly employed in retail and wholesale trade. There is a gurudwara in Rosario de la Frontera.

References

 
Bilateral relations of India
India